Roam Rome Mein is a 2019 Indian psychological-drama film directed by Tannishtha Chatterjee, and produced by Eros International, Pankaj Razdan, and Rising Star Entertainment. It features Nawazuddin Siddiqui, Tannishtha Chatterjee and Valentina Corti, Francesco Apolloni in main roles. It also includes a supporting cast of  Vineet Kumar, Andrea Scarduzio, Ciera Foster and Priyansh Jora.

The film premiered on 5 October at 24th Busan International Film Festival held from 3 to 12 October 2019. It was showcased in "A Window on Asian Cinema". This film marks directorial debut for actress Tannishtha Chatterjee. The film is in English, Hindi and Italian.

Synopsis
The film revolves around Reena (Tannishtha Chatterjee), who goes to Rome, Italy to find her freedom from strict patriarchal father, and Raj (Nawazuddin Siddiqui), her brother, and his journey of awakening as he goes to find her and in the journey he learns things about Reena's life as well as his own.

Cast
 Nawazuddin Siddiqui as Raj
 Tannishtha Chatterjee as Reena
 Valentina Corti
 Isha Talwar
 Francesco Apollini
 Urbano Barberini
 Pamela Villoresi
 Vineet Kumar
 Andrea Scarduzio
 Ciera Foster
 Priyansh Jora
 Giada Benedetti
 Tanuka Laghate
Arshia Verma as young Reena

Release
The film had its World premiere at Busan International Film Festival held from 3 to 12 October 2019. It had its European premiere at International Rome Film Festival and Indian premiere at Mumbai Film Festival MAMI.

Awards
Tannishtha Chatterjee won the Asia Star award presented by Marie Claire at the Busan International Film Festival 2019.

The film won best film in Berlin at the IndoGermanFilmWeek 2020

Reviews
Paroleacolori.com called the directors work of great artistic, sociological, cultural value and of notable emotional impact. Vittorio de Argo reviewed it at Rome film festival said  Roam Rome Mein captivated the audience and impressed even your old and cynical sent. An ambitious, particular, lively film full of twists and stylistically innovative and bold choices.
Cinecircoloromano.it called the film Unique and original.
Cinematographe.it called it a cinematic jewel which treats the role of women in society as a subject with originality as never before. The Hollywood Reporter has reviewed it as a crowd pleasing fantasy with a feminist punch which found strong audience support in initial outings at the Busan, Mumbai and Rome film festivals.

References

External links

2019 films
Indian psychological drama films
Indian feminist films
Indian multilingual films
Films set in Rome
Films shot in Rome
2019 directorial debut films
Films scored by Alokananda Dasgupta
2019 drama films
Films set in Italy
Films set in Lazio
Films shot in Italy
Films shot in Lazio